Urban Durnik (born June 19, 1997) is a Slovenian professional basketball player for KK Rogaška of the Slovenian League. He is a 2.04 m tall power forward and center.

Professional career
Durnik started playing professional basketball for Zlatorog Laško.

In August 2018, Durnik signed with Helios Suns. On January 9, 2019, he parted ways with Helios Suns.

On January 16, 2019, He signed with Rogaška.

References

External links
 Eurobasket.com profile
 REALGM profile

1997 births
Living people
Slovenian men's basketball players
OKK Spars players
Power forwards (basketball)
People from Trbovlje
Helios Suns players